Dominic Soong Chok Soon (born ) is a former male badminton player. He was a doubles player who played first for Malaysia and later for Canada.

Career 
Dominic Soong came second at the 1973 Southeast Asian Games in the men's doubles with Punch Gunalan. A year later, they jointly won bronze at the Commonwealth Games. In 1976 Soong played on the Malaysian Thomas Cup team which upset Denmark and finished second to Indonesia. In his new home in Canada, he won the men's doubles competition at the individual championships in 1978.

Coach 
Dominic Soong is the founder of the Soong Badminton Academy based in Ottawa, Canada. Having coached for over 40 years, Dominic coaches players of all ages and regularly takes them to compete at regional, provincial, and national level tournaments.

Achievements

Southeast Asian Peninsular Games 
Men's doubles

Mixed doubles

Commonwealth Games 
Men's doubles

References 
Report on the Malaysian Thomas Cup

Canadian male badminton players
Malaysian male badminton players
1950 births
Living people
Malaysian sportspeople of Chinese descent
Canadian sportspeople of Chinese descent
Malaysian emigrants to Canada
Badminton players at the 1974 Asian Games
Badminton players at the 1974 British Commonwealth Games
Commonwealth Games medallists in badminton
Commonwealth Games bronze medallists for Malaysia
Asian Games competitors for Malaysia
Medallists at the 1974 British Commonwealth Games